N. orientalis  may refer to:
 Naticarius orientalis, a predatory sea snail species
 Nicrophorus orientalis (disambiguation), a disambiguation page
 Nocardia orientalis, now known as Amycolatopsis orientalis

See also
 Orientalis (disambiguation)